Bangkok Love Stories: Objects of Affection is a segment of the 2019 Thai-language television anthology series Bangkok Love Stories, created by Ekachai Uekrongtham and starring Kanokchat Manyaton and Apinya Sakuljaroensuk. The plot is set in Bangkok's Ratchada district and revolves around a troubled young woman witnessing two men murdering two women, and records it on her phone. Later, she meets a cell phone repairman who might help her fix more than just the phone.

The first episode was released on February 14, 2019 and the last on May 9, 2019 on GMM 25.

Cast
  as Qten
 Apinya Sakuljaroensuk as Jess
  as Tae-hee
 Nalin Hohler as Dada

Release
Bangkok Love Stories: Objects of Affection was released between February 14, 2019 and May 9, 2019 on GMM 25.

References

External links
 
 

2010s Thai television series
2010s drama television series
Thai drama television series
2019 Thai television series debuts
Thai-language television shows
Bangkok Love Stories